Redig may refer to:

People
  (1905-1989), Brazilian art historian
 Ida Redig (born 1987), Swedish singer and actress
 Olavo Redig de Campos (1906–1984), Brazilian architect

Places
 Redig, South Dakota, United States